is a city located in Aichi Prefecture, Japan. , the city had an estimated population of 69,525 in 30,185 households, and a population density of 2,994 persons per km2.

Geography

Toyoake is located in the coastal flatlands of central Aichi Prefecture, bordering the Nagoya metropolis.

Climate
The city has a climate characterized by hot and humid summers, and relatively mild winters (Köppen climate classification Cfa).  The average annual temperature in Toyoake is 15.6 °C. The average annual rainfall is 1586 mm with September as the wettest month. The temperatures are highest on average in August, at around 27.9 °C, and lowest in January, at around 4.3 °C.

Demographics
Per Japanese census data, the population of Toyoake exploded during the 1970s and has continued to grow.

Surrounding municipalities
Aichi Prefecture
Tōgō
Kariya
Ōbu
Nagoya（Midori-ku）

History

Middle Ages
The area of modern Toyoake was part of Owari Province and was the location of many battles during the Sengoku period, one of them being the Battle of Okehazama.

Early modern period
It was part of the holdings of Owari Domain under the Edo period Tokugawa shogunate.

Late modern period
With the establishment of the modern municipalities system in 1888, Toyoake Village was created within Aichi District, Aichi.

Contemporary history
Toyoake became a town on January 1, 1951, and was elevated to city status on August 1, 1982.

Government

Toyoake has a mayor-council form of government with a directly elected mayor and a unicameral city legislature of 20 members. The city contributes one member to the Aichi Prefectural Assembly.  In terms of national politics, the city is part of Aichi District 7 of the lower house of the Diet of Japan.

External relations

Twin towns – Sister cities

International
Friendship city
Shepparton（Victoria, Australia）
since October 22, 2003

National
Friendship city
Toyone（Aichi Prefecture, Chūbu region）
since November 3, 1977
Agematsu（Nagano Prefecture, Chūbu region）
since November 12, 2002

Economy
Due to its proximity to the Nagoya metropolis, Toyoake is largely a bedroom community with some light manufacturing and product distribution.

Education

Universities
Fujita Health University
Ohkagakuen University

Colleges
Nagoya College

Primary and secondary schools
Toyoake has nine public elementary schools and three public junior high schools operated by the city government, and one public high schools operated by the Aichi Prefectural Board of Education. There is also one private junior high school and one private high school. The prefecture also operates one special education school for the handicapped.

International schools
North Korean:
 Aichi Korean Middle and High School

Transportation

Railways

Conventional lines
Meitetsu
Nagoya Main Line：-  -  -

Roads

Expressways
  Isewangan Expressway - Toyoake Interchange

Japan National Route

Local attractions

Places
Ano Ichirizuka, milestone markers on the old Tōkaidō, National Historic Site
Ruins of Kutsukake Castle (沓掛城址)
Okezazama Battlefield site, National Historic Site
Chukyo Racecourse (中京競馬場)

Culture

Mascots
Monami Gentsuki
Nobunaga-kun and Yoshimoto-kun

Events

April

June

August

November

Gallery

Notable people from Toyoake 
Kimiyasu Kudoh, professional baseball player

References

External links

  (with link to pages in English)

 
Cities in Aichi Prefecture